Dharmapur is a village in the district of South Goa, Goa, India.

Geography

References

Cities and towns in South Goa district